Mary Farkas (1911 – June 7, 1992) was the director of the First Zen Institute of America (FZIA), running the center's administrative functions for many years following the death of her teacher (Sokei-an) in 1945. Though she was not a teacher of Zen Buddhism in any traditional sense of the word, she did help to carry on the lineage of Sokei-an and also was editor of the FZIA's journal, Zen Notes, starting with Volume 1 in 1954. Additionally, she also edited books about Sokei-an, i.e. "The Zen Eye" and "Zen Pivots." Through her transcriptions of his talks, the institute was able to continue on the lineage without having a formal teacher (Sokei-an left no Dharma heir).

Bibliography

See also
Buddhism in the United States
List of Rinzai Buddhists
Timeline of Zen Buddhism in the United States

Notes

References

Stirling, Isabel. Zen Pioneer: The Life & Works of Ruth Fuller Sasaki (2006)  Shoemaker & Hoard. 

Rinzai Buddhists
1911 births
1992 deaths
American Zen Buddhists
Female Buddhist spiritual teachers